Ante Rukavina (born 18 June 1986) is a retired Croatian footballer who last played for Viborg FF. He also played at Šibenik, Hajduk Split and Panathinaikos earlier in his career.

Club career
Rukavina started his professional career with his hometown club HNK Šibenik. He made his debut for Šibenik on 29 July 2006 under coach Ivan Pudar against NK Osijek, having turned 20 years old just one month earlier. After making a name for himself as one of the hottest young prospects in the Croatian First Football League, he moved down the Croatian coast to Split side Hajduk in a deal worth around €400,000 in January 2007. Over the next 18 months at Hajduk, Ante continued impressing European scouts by scoring 9 goals in 34 appearances in what was a difficult time for the Croatian giants.

On 5 July 2008, he signed for the Greek side Panathinaikos FC who saw him as a 'useful addition to their offensive lineup for the next season', considering him to be an 'impressive young prospect'. The four-year deal was reportedly worth €2.8 million. In two seasons at Panathinaikos, Rukavina managed 11 goals in 55 appearances but was ultimately judged as a flop considering his high fee and high expectations when he arrived at the Greek side.

Dinamo Zagreb
On 26 July 2010, Rukavina returned to Croatia and signed for champions Dinamo Zagreb in a transfer worth €700,000.

He made his debut for the club on 4 August 2010 at home to Moldovan side Sheriff Tiraspol in the return leg of the third qualifying round for the UEFA Champions League. On 7 August 2010, he made his domestic league debut for Dinamo in a 1–1 draw at NK Varaždin, netting the opening goal of the match in the fifth minute. Later that month, he scored a brace to give the club a 2-0 win at Hungarian Győr FC in the first leg of the UEFA Europa League play-offs. He went on to make five appearances in the group stage of the UEFA Europa League, scoring the opening goal in a 2-0 win at home to Villarreal on 16 September 2010.

On 18 July 2012, Rukavina scored a last-minute goal against Bulgarian club Ludogorets Razgrad in a Champions League match to help his team to a 1–1 draw. He also netted twice in the return leg held a week later, which was won in a dramatic fashion by the Croatian side by a score of 3–2.

In January 2014, it was decided by Dinamo's sporting director and manager Zoran Mamic that Rukavina was surplus to the club's requirements. He was sent home early from Dinamo's winter training camp in Turkey and was told he was free to find a new club.

In August 2014 he moved to NK Lokomotiva on a loan.

In August 2015 he moved to Viborg FF in the Danish Superliga on loan, but only played 5 matches as substitute and not scoring any goals.

International career
Rukavina played for the Croatian national under-21 team between 2007 and 2008, Rukavina was called up to the senior side squad for the first time on 12 March 2007, but did not appear for his country at full international level.

Career statistics

Honours
Panathinaikos
Superleague Greece (1) : 2009–10
Greek Football Cup (1) : 2009–10

Dinamo Zagreb
Croatian First League (4) : 2010–11, 2011–12, 2012–13, 2013–14
Croatian Cup (2) : 2010–11, 2011–12
Croatian Supercup (1) : 2013

Individual
Croatian Hope of the Year : 2006

References

Mensah og Rukavina færdige i Viborg‚ bold.dk, 3 May 2016

External links
 

1986 births
Living people
Sportspeople from Šibenik
Association football forwards
Croatian footballers
Croatia youth international footballers
Croatia under-21 international footballers
HNK Šibenik players
HNK Hajduk Split players
Panathinaikos F.C. players
GNK Dinamo Zagreb players
NK Lokomotiva Zagreb players
Viborg FF players
Croatian Football League players
Super League Greece players
Croatian expatriate footballers
Expatriate footballers in Greece
Expatriate men's footballers in Denmark
Croatian expatriate sportspeople in Greece
Croatian expatriate sportspeople in Denmark